Bryggeriet Vestfyen A/S is a Danish beverage company established in 1885.

Brands
Brands held by the Bryggeriet Vestfyen:

 Willemoes Ale
 Willemoes Stout
 Vestfyen Ren Pilsner
 Vestfyen Pilsner
 Vestfyen Classic
 Willemoes Strong Lager
 Willemoes Porter
 Willemoes Høstbryg
 Willemoes Påskebryg
 Willemoes Påske Ale
 Willemoes Jule Ale
 Willemoes Julebryg
 Willemoes Classic
 Nat-expressen
 Pale Ale
 Prins Kristian
 Danish Pride
 Påskebryg
 Julebryg
 Vestfyen Light Pilsner
 Prima Hvidtøl

Soda-Water

 Jolly Cola

References

Notes

Bibliography

External links
 Brewery Vestfyen, Assens - Denmark
 Jolly Cola - Part of the brewery Vestfyen

Danish brands
Danish companies established in 1885
Food and drink companies established in 1885
Breweries in Denmark